Coney Island is a neighborhood, visitor attraction, and former island in Brooklyn, New York.

Coney Island may also refer to:

Places

Bermuda
 Coney Island, Bermuda, an island in St. George's Parish

Northern Ireland
 Coney Island, Lough Neagh, an island in County Armagh
 Coney Island, County Down, a townland in County Down
 Coney Island, County Fermanagh or Inish Rath, an island and townland in County Fermanagh
 Coney Island, County Londonderry, a townland in County Londonderry

Republic of Ireland
 Coney Island, County Sligo or Inishmulclohy, an island and townland in County Sligo
 Coney Island, County Clare, an island and townland in County Clare
 Coney Island, County Cork, a townland in County Cork
 Coney Island, County Donegal, a townland in County Donegal

Singapore
 Coney Island, Singapore or Pulau Serangoon, an island off the coast of Punggol in Singapore
 Coney Island Park, a park on that island

United States
related to main meaning Coney Island visitor attraction, and former island in Brooklyn, New York.
 Coney Island Avenue, a roadway from central Brooklyn to Coney Island in New York City
 Coney Island–Stillwell Avenue (New York City Subway), a New York City Subway station
 Coney Island, Minnesota, an unincorporated community
 Coney Island, Missouri, a village
 Coney Island (Cincinnati, Ohio), an amusement park
 Coney Island (West Virginia), an island

Other geographical uses 
 Coney Island (restaurant), a distinctive Detroit-centered type of restaurant that serves Coney hot dogs

Film
 Coney Island (1917 film), a silent comedy film starring Fatty Arbuckle and Buster Keaton
 Coney Island (1928 film), a film by Ralph Ince starring Lois Wilson, Lucille Mendez and Eugene Strong
 Coney Island (1943 film), a musical film starring Betty Grable
 Coney Island (1991 film), a documentary film about the island

Music
 Coney Island (album), a 1975 album by Herb Alpert and The T.J.B.
 "Coney Island" (Van Morrison song), a 1989 spoken-word piece by Van Morrison
 "Coney Island", a 2001 song by Death Cab for Cutie from The Photo Album
 "Coney Island", a 2010 song by the Coral from Butterfly House
 "Coney Island" (Taylor Swift song), a 2020 song by Taylor Swift featuring the National from Evermore

See also
 Coney (disambiguation)
 Coney I-Lander, a Tulsa-based chain of restaurants
 Coney Island hot dog